Fakir is both a given name and a surname. As a surname, it may also take the definite article as Al Fakir. Notable people with the name include:

Given name:
 Fakir Alamgir (21st century), Bangladeshi singer
 Fakir Aziao-Din (16th century), one of Akbar's chief advisors
 Fakir Mohan Senapati (1843–1918), Indian writer
 Fakir Musafar (1930-2018), American performance artist

Surname:
 Lalon Fakir (1774–1890), Bengali philosopher, author, Baul saint
 Abdul "Duke" Fakir (born 1935), American singer (Four Tops)
 Ajan Fakir (17th century), Sufi saint and poet
 Allan Fakir (1932–2000), Pakistani folk singer
 Jamal Fakir (born 1982), French rugby league footballer
 Nassim Al Fakir (born 1977), Swedish musician, presenter, comedian, and host
 Salem Al Fakir (born 1981), Swedish singer and musician

See also
Fakir (disambiguation)
Faqir (given name)

See also 
 Al Fakir (disambiguation)
 Faqir (given name)